"Skipping Stones" is a short story by Orson Scott Card.  It first appeared in his short story collection Capitol and then later in The Worthing Saga.

Plot summary
"Skipping Stones" is the story of two boys who grow up together.  One is the son of a very wealthy man while the other is an indentured servant.  Despite these differences the two boys become best friends. As children they both enjoy art and study it together. When they grow up, the rich boy goes into his father’s business and begins using the fictional drug Somec to put himself into a state of suspended animation for five years at a time so that he will live longer - a common practice in his society for those who can afford it. When he becomes a young man, the servant is released from his contract but is too poor to go on Somec, so he continues to paint to make a living.  Each time he comes out of suspended animation the rich man finds that his friend is becoming more successful as an artist. Eventually the artist is famous and rich enough to afford to go on Somec himself - but declines to do so, preferring to live his life as a contiguous whole rather than skipping across time like a stone across the water.

Connection to the Worthing Saga
This story uses several plot elements also used in The Worthing Saga, such as the sleeping drug Somec and the taping of memories.  It takes place on the planet Capitol many years after the events in the story "A Thousand Deaths".

See also

List of works by Orson Scott Card
Orson Scott Card

External links
 The official Orson Scott Card website

Short stories by Orson Scott Card